Rohri  (Sindhi: روهڙي) is a city of Sukkur District, Sindh province, Pakistan. It is located on the east bank of the Indus River, located directly across from Sukkur, the third largest city in Sindh. Rohri town is the administrative headquarters of Rohri Taluka, and tehsil of Sukkur District with which it forms a metropolitan area.

History
 

Roruka, as capital of the Sauvira Kingdom, is mentioned as an important trading center in early Buddhist literature. Little is known about the city's history prior to the Arab invasion in the eighth century, but Aror was the capital of the A-Ror Dynasty, which was followed by Rai Dynasty and then the Brahman Dynasty that once ruled northern Sindh.

In 711 CE, Aror was captured by the army of Muslim general Muhammad bin Qasim. In 962 CE, a massive earthquake struck the region, causing the course of the Indus River to shift. Aror was re-founded as Rohri afterwards.

Rohri served as a busy port along the Indus by the 1200s, and was a major trading centre for agricultural produce.

Climate
Rohri has a hot desert climate (Köppen climate classification BWh) with extremely hot summers and mild winters. Rohri is very dry, with the little rain it receives mostly falling in the monsoon season from July to September. The average annual rainfall of Rohri is 105.8 mm as per 1991-2020 period. The highest annual rainfall ever is 669.4 mm, recorded in 2022 and the lowest annual rainfall ever is 0 mm as it was a record dry period in the city in 1941.

References

External links
 The Archaeology of Rohri

Sukkur District
Metropolitan areas of Pakistan
Populated places in Sukkur District